Ciano may refer to:

 Ciano (surname), a surname of Italian origin
 Ciano (Crocetta del Montello), a hamlet (frazione) of Crocetta del Montello, Veneto
 Ciano d'Enza, a hamlet (frazione) of Canossa, Emilia-Romagna
 Ciano (album), album of rock band Brazilian Fresno